Ekkehard is an 1878 German-language opera by Johann Joseph Abert to a libretto by Adolf Kröner after the novel by Joseph Victor von Scheffel. The plot tells a romantic episode in the life of Ekkehard II of Saint Gall.

Recording
Ekkehard -  Jonas Kaufmann, Christian Gerhaher, Nyla van Ingen, Susanne Kelling, Henryk Böhm, Alfred Reiter, Stuttgarter Choristen, SWR Rundfunkorchester, Peter Falk.  2CDs Capriccio, DDD/LA, 1998

References

Operas
1878 operas